Alexa Allen is a Jamaican international football forward.

External links 
 

Living people
Jamaica women's international footballers
Jamaican women's footballers
1994 births
Auburn Tigers women's soccer players
NC State Wolfpack women's soccer players
American sportspeople of Jamaican descent
American women's soccer players
Soccer players from Georgia (U.S. state)
Women's association football forwards